The 1953 FIBA World Championship for Women(Spanish: 1953 Campeonato Mundial FIBA Femenino) was the first edition of the FIBA Women's Basketball World Cup. It was held in Chile from 7 March to 22 March 1953. Ten national teams entered the event under the auspices of FIBA, the sport's governing body. The city of Santiago hosted the tournament. The United States won its first title.

Venues 
All games were played at the Estadio Nacional de Chile.

Squads

Format 
 In the preliminary round, each team played a single game, with the winner advancing to the final round. The losing teams played in the first repass round, while the losing team with the worst point margin played in the second repass round.
 In the first repass round, four teams were paired again and played a single game where the winners advanced to the second repass round and the losing teams to the classification round. In the second repass round, a round-robin group of three teams was formed, where the top team advanced to the final round and the other two teams to the classification round.
 In the final round, a six-team round-robin group was formed to compete for the championship and second through sixth places in the final standings.
 In the classification round another round-robin group of four teams was formed to define seventh through tenth place in the final standings.

Preliminary round 
Winners qualify to the final round. Losing teams to the first repass round, and the losing team with the largest point margin to the second repass round.

Times given below are in Chile Standard Time (UTC−4).

Repass round

First round

Second round 

|}

Classification round 

|}

Final round 

|}

Final standings

References 

 Results (Archived 2009-05-20)
 1953 World Championship for Women, FIBA.com.

1953
1953 in women's basketball
1953 in Chilean women's sport
International women's basketball competitions hosted by Chile
FIBA World Championship for Women
Sports competitions in Santiago
1950s in Santiago, Chile